Rositz is a municipality in the district Altenburger Land, in Thuringia, Germany.

History
Within the German Empire (1871-1918), Rositz was part of the Duchy of Saxe-Altenburg.

An RAF raid bombed the oil refinery in Rositz on February 14/15, 1945 as part of Operation Thunderclap.

References

Oil campaign of World War II
Altenburger Land
Duchy of Saxe-Altenburg